Adam Roger Hattersley (born March 24, 1978) is an American politician and author who was a member of the Florida House of Representatives from the 59th district in Hillsborough County from 2018 to 2020. He ran for Chief Financial Officer of Florida in the 2022 election.

He is an engineer, small business owner, and internationally certified men's gymnastics judge and he earned a Bronze Star for his service in the U.S. Navy during the Iraq War.

Education 
Hattersley received his Bachelor of Engineering and Master of Science in Engineering in aerospace engineering from the University of Michigan. He was a member of the men's gymnastics team at the University of Michigan, and was on Michigan's 1999 NCAA national championship team. Today, Hattersley is an internationally certified judge for men's gymnastics.

Military service 
After receiving his master's degree in engineering, Hattersley joined the United States Navy as an officer in the year 2000. He served as a nuclear submarine officer on the USS Columbus, and then as an electrical engineering instructor at the United States Naval Academy. In 2006, he deployed for Operation Iraqi Freedom, and received a Bronze Star for his service.

Political career

Election
Hattersley was elected to the 59th district of the Florida House of Representatives in the general election on November 6, 2018, winning 51 percent of the vote over 49 percent of Republican candidate Joe Wicker. He was the first Democrat to win in Florida's 59th state house district since the seat was drawn in 2012.

He is the author of the book Accidental Politician, published June 2021, an autobiographical account of his 2018 campaign.

Hattersley is currently running for Chief Financial Officer of Florida and will be on the General Election ballot on November 8, 2022.

U.S. House of Representatives campaign 
In July 2019, Hattersley announced that he would not seek reelection in the Florida State Legislature, and would instead challenge Congressman Ross Spano in Florida's 15th congressional district. Earning 33 percent of the vote, Hattersley placed second in the primary election out of three total candidates, with Alan Cohn advancing to the general election.

Chief Financial Officer of Florida Campaign 
Adam Hattersley is currently running for Chief Financial Officer of Florida and focusing on addressing the property insurance crisis, holding elected officials accountable, and taking politics out of the role of the CFO. Hattersley lost the election to incumbent Jimmy Patronis.

Political positions 
Hattersley supports a public health insurance option to lower health insurance costs. He calls for action to address global warming. He has proposals for improving educational opportunities for veterans.  He is actively campaigning on proposing solutions to address the property insurance crisis in Florida.

References

External links
Government website
Campaign website

Accidental Politician book
The Interview (Democrat for CFO) Adam Hattersley on CW34
Election 2022: Florida CFO Patronis faces ex-Rep. Hattersley

1978 births
21st-century American politicians
Candidates in the 2020 United States elections
Florida Independents
Living people
Hattersley, Adam
Michigan Wolverines men's gymnasts